Hyptis pseudoglauca is a species of flowering plant in the family Lamiaceae. It is found only in Ecuador. Its natural habitat is subtropical or tropical moist montane forests.

References

pseudoglauca
Flora of Ecuador
Endangered plants
Taxonomy articles created by Polbot